The following elections occurred in the year 1851.

 1851 Chilean presidential election
 1851 Liberian general election

North America

United States
 1851 New York state election
 1851 Texas gubernatorial election
 United States Senate election in New York, 1851

See also
 :Category:1851 elections

1851
Elections